ARS++ was developed in 2002 for the book Undiluted Programming to demonstrate ARS based programming in a real world context. ARS++ is used in the book to implement an A++ interpreter and an XML Database System. Even the implementation of ARS++ in C was used to demonstrate ARS-based programming.

Principally the programming language Scheme would have been perfectly all right to be used for these demonstration programs if Scheme had included primitives supporting network programming, database programming plus a few others required in this context.

The definition of the programming language Scheme does not include those primitives however, leaving this issue up to the implementors of the language. The consequence is that there exist many Scheme implementations, almost none of them covering all areas essential for real application programs. This is the historical background that gave birth to the development of ARS++.

ARS++ explained by its name 
The name ARS++, being an acronym for ARS + Scheme + Extensions, indicates that ARS++ has a lot to do with Scheme but that it is not equivalent to Scheme.

 The first part of the name refers to the core of the language, which is nothing else but A++, i.e. Abstraction + Reference + Synthesis.
 The second part in the name of ARS++ stands for the primitive functions that are imported from Scheme, giving ARS++ almost the same functionality as Scheme. Primitive functions are those, that are not and cannot be defined as lambda abstractions because they are representing a functionality that can only be provided by the underlying operating system or the hardware.
 The third part of the name refers to primitive functions that are not defined in R5RS (the official definition of the programming language Scheme) but are nevertheless important for real world programming like functions allowing to work with regular expressions, with TCP/IP networks, with embedded databases (e.g. Berkeley DB, GNU database manager) and a few that provide an interface with the operating system.

From a practical point of view a Scheme implementation that includes support for regular expressions, databases, sockets and also provides an interface to the operating system can be called an ARS++ language.

See also 
 ARS-based programming
 A++
 Educational programming language

References 

Educational programming languages